Hall Terry Snoddy (March 18, 1899 – ?) also known as Terry Snowday was a college football player.

Early years
Hall Terry Snoddy was born on March 18, 1899, in Owensboro, Kentucky, to Carey Snoddy and Ruth Hall.

Centre College

Snoddy was a prominent end and halfback for the Centre Praying Colonels of Centre College in Danville, Kentucky; a member of two of its most famous teams in 1919 and 1921.   Snoddy was selected to at least one All-Southern team every year he played.

1919
The 1919 team went undefeated and was named a national champion by Sagarin.

1921
The 1921 team beat Harvard 6–0 in one of the greatest upsets in college football history. One account reads "Snoddy, Centre's left halfback, was literally a "John-on-the-spot" in getting under the ball. And it was Snoddy who gained when the gaining counted, by his superior speed." The Colonels then played a postseason bowl game against Texas A&M known as the 1922 Dixie Classic. Snoddy scored Centre's first touchdown in the game. Centre would lose 22 to 14.

1922
In 1922 he changed his name to Snowday, the original Scotch spelling.

References

American football ends
Centre Colonels football players
All-Southern college football players
American football halfbacks
People from Owensboro, Kentucky
1899 births
Players of American football from Kentucky
Year of death missing